Lina Galli (10 February 1899 – 23 June 1993) was an Italian writer. Her work was part of the literature event in the art competition at the 1936 Summer Olympics.

References

1899 births
1993 deaths
20th-century Italian women writers
Olympic competitors in art competitions
People from Poreč